is a railway station located in the town of Fukaura, Aomori Prefecture, Japan, operated by the East Japan Railway Company (JR East).

Lines

Station layout
Mutsu-Sawabe  Station has one ground-level side platform serving a single bi-directional track. The station is unattended, and is managed from Fukaura Station.

History
Mutsu-Sawabe Station was opened on July 30, 1932 as a station on the Japanese Government Railways (JGR). With the privatization of the Japanese National Railways (successor of JGR) on April 1, 1987, it came under the operational control of JR East.

Surrounding area

See also
 List of Railway Stations in Japan

References

External links

  

Stations of East Japan Railway Company
Railway stations in Aomori Prefecture
Gonō Line
Railway stations in Japan opened in 1936
Fukaura, Aomori